Perfect Strangers is a 2003 New Zealand film directed by Gaylene Preston and starring Sam Neill and Rachael Blake.

Plot
Melanie, (Rachael Blake) is a waitress who works at an unnamed restaurant, presumably in New Zealand. One night, she meets a Man, (Sam Neill) they spend some time together, before Melanie asks him if he wants to go home. He says sure, and asks, "Your place or mine?" She answers with his, and they go to a dock, where his small boat is. After a short time, she passes out, and when she wakes up, they're in the middle of open ocean, with land nowhere in sight.

Cast
 Sam Neill as The Man
 Rachael Blake as Melanie
 Robyn Malcolm as Aileen
 Madeleine Sami as Andrea
 Jed Brophy as Pete
 Joel Tobeck as Bill
 Paul Glover as Jim

Reviews
 2003 Chicago International Film Festival

References

External links
 
 
 

New Zealand drama films
2003 films
2003 drama films
2000s English-language films